Edward Washburn Whitaker (1841–1922) was a Union Army officer during the American Civil War.  He was awarded the Medal of Honor for gallantry in action in 1864.

Biography

Civil War service
Whitaker and three of his brothers enlisted in the Union Army during the Civil War. He originally enlisted as a sergeant in the 2nd New York Cavalry Regiment.

On April 23, 1864 Whitaker was commissioned as captain of Company E of the 1st Connecticut Cavalry Regiment. He earned the Congressional Medal of Honor for his actions at Reams Station, Virginia, on June 29, 1864 by riding through enemy lines to deliver dispatches to Major General George Meade, the commander of the Army of the Potomac.  The Medal of Honor was awarded to him on April 2, 1898 - almost 34 years after his action.

In October 1864 Whitaker was promoted to the rank of major and in January 1865 to lieutenant colonel.

In March 1865, at age 23, he was brevetted (i.e. an honorary promotion) as a brigadier general of volunteers for meritorious service during the war and was one of the youngest generals in the Civil War. (The youngest general of the Civil War was Galusha Pennypacker who was promoted to brigadier general shortly before he turned 21.) He was honorable mustered out of service on August 2, 1865.

Post war

General Whitaker joined the District of Columbia Society of the Sons of the American Revolution and was assigned SAR national membership number is 13552 and District of Columbia Society number 702.

He was also a First Class Companion of the District of Columbia Commandery of the Military Order of the Loyal Legion of the United States - a military society composed of officers of the Union armed forces and their descendants.

General Edward W. Whitaker died at the age of eighty-one on July 30, 1922.  He is buried in Arlington National Cemetery.

Medal of Honor citation
While acting as an aide voluntarily carried dispatches from the commanding general to Gen. Meade, forcing his way with a single troop of Cavalry, through an Infantry division of the enemy in the most distinguished manner, though he lost half his escort in the desperate ride at Reams Station, Virginia on 29 June 1864.

Dates of rank
Sergeant, Company D, 2nd New York Cavalry - August 21, 1861
Captain, 1st Connecticut Cavalry - April 23, 1864
Major, 1st Connecticut Cavalry - October 1, 1864
Lieutenant Colonel, 1st Connecticut Cavalry - January 17, 1865
Brevet Brigadier General, U.S. Volunteers - March 13, 1865

See also
List of American Civil War brevet generals (Union)

References

1841 births
1922 deaths
People from Killingly, Connecticut
People of Connecticut in the American Civil War
Union Army officers
United States Army Medal of Honor recipients
American Civil War recipients of the Medal of Honor
Sons of the American Revolution